Players and pairs who neither have high enough rankings nor receive wild cards may participate in a qualifying tournament held one week before the annual Wimbledon Tennis Championships.

Seeds

  Andreas Seppi (qualified)
  Arnaud Clément (qualified)
  Justin Gimelstob (qualifying competition, lucky loser)
  Paul Goldstein (qualifying competition, lucky loser)
  Jeff Morrison (qualified)
  Antony Dupuis (qualified)
  Giovanni Lapentti (withdrew)
  Grégory Carraz (first round)
  Robin Vik (first round)
  Dick Norman (qualified)
  Daniele Bracciali (qualifying competition, lucky loser)
  Kristof Vliegen (first round)
  Jan-Michael Gambill (qualifying competition)
  Rubén Ramírez Hidalgo (first round)
  Wesley Moodie (qualifying competition)
  Lukáš Dlouhý (first round)
  Novak Djokovic (qualified)
  Gilles Simon (qualifying competition)
  Fernando Vicente (qualifying competition)
  Nicolas Mahut (qualifying competition)
  Michael Ryderstedt (qualifying competition)
  Jo-Wilfried Tsonga (withdrew)
  George Bastl (qualified)
  Michal Mertiňák (second round)
  Amer Delić (qualifying competition)
  Olivier Patience (first round)
  Noam Okun (qualified)
  Lu Yen-hsun (qualified)
  Alexander Waske (first round)
  Peter Luczak (first round)
  Ramón Delgado (second round)
  André Sá (first round)

Qualifiers

  Andreas Seppi
  Arnaud Clément
  George Bastl
  Jamie Delgado
  Jeff Morrison
  Antony Dupuis
  Danai Udomchoke
  Gilles Elseneer
  Roko Karanušić
  Dick Norman
  Adrián García
  Lu Yen-hsun
  Noam Okun
  Tuomas Ketola
  Novak Djokovic
  Tobias Summerer

Lucky losers

  Justin Gimelstob
  Paul Goldstein
  Daniele Bracciali

Qualifying draw

First qualifier

Second qualifier

Third qualifier

Fourth qualifier

Fifth qualifier

Sixth qualifier

Seventh qualifier

Eighth qualifier

Ninth qualifier

Tenth qualifier

Eleventh qualifier

Twelfth qualifier

Thirteenth qualifier

Fourteenth qualifier

Fifteenth qualifier

Sixteenth qualifier

External links

 2005 Wimbledon Championships – Men's draws and results at the International Tennis Federation

Men's Singles Qualifying
Wimbledon Championship by year – Men's singles qualifying